Smolan can refer to:

 Rick Smolan, photographer
 Sandy Smolan, feature film, television, and documentary film director
 Smolan, Kansas, a small town in the United States
 Smolan Township, Saline County, Kansas, a civil township